Vitaliy Khutoryanskiy FRSC  is a British and Kazakhstani scientist,  Professor of Formulation Science and Royal Society Industry Fellow at the University of Reading. His research focuses on polymers, biomaterials, nanomaterials, drug delivery and pharmaceutical sciences. Khutoryanskiy has published over 200 original research articles, book chapters and reviews; his publications have attracted > 9000 citations and his current h-index is 47:. He received several prestigious awards in recognition for his research in polymers, colloids and drug delivery and also for contributions to research peer-review and mentoring of early career researchers. He holds several honorary professorship titles from different universities.

Education and career 
Khutoryanskiy was born and grew up in Almaty, Kazakhstan. He studied at Al-Farabi Kazakh National University, graduating with BSc in Chemistry in 1996. He earned his MSc in Polymer Chemistry in 1998 and then PhD in Polymer Chemistry in 2000 from the same institution. His project was focused on the studies of hydrogen-bonded interpolymer complexes and preparation of hydrophilic films on their basis. During his PhD studies he also spent 4 months in the research group of Janusz Rosiak at Łódź University of Technology, Poland, where specialised in radiation chemistry of hydrophilic polymers. He worked as a Lecturer in Polymer Science at Al-Farabi Kazakh National University in 2000-2002. In 2002 he moved to the United Kingdom and joined the research group of Ijeoma Uchegbu at the University of Strathclyde as a postdoctoral research assistant, where worked on the synthesis of chitosan amphiphiles and their studies for drug delivery. In 2004 he moved to the University of Manchester to work as a postdoctoral research assistant of Nicola Tirelli and studied the design of oxidation-responsive nanoparticles. In 2005 Khutoryanskiy was appointed as a Lecturer in Pharmaceutics at newly-established Reading School of Pharmacy, University of Reading. In 2010 he was promoted to Reader (Associate Professor) in Pharmaceutical Materials and in 2014 he became full Professor of Formulation Science.

Research 
Earlier research of Khutoryanskiy was focused on the studies of hydrogen-bonded interpolymer complexes formed by poly(carboxylic acids) and various non-ionic polymers in aqueous and organic solvents. He established the factors affecting the complexation between polymers such as solvent nature, pH and ionic strength of solutions, nature and molecular weight of interacting polymers as well as environmental temperature. He also researched radiation-mediated grafting of hydrophilic polymers on polyolefin surfaces and complexes formed between linear polymers and hydrogels. His current research broadly focuses on water-soluble polymers, colloids and hydrogels for applications in drug delivery, biomaterials, and various formulations (food technology, health care products and agrochemicals). His group has pioneered several new families of polymers and nanomaterials with enhanced mucoadhesive properties, they also were the first to develop mucosa-mimetic polymeric hydrogels that can be used in place of animal tissues to study mucoadhesive dosage forms and demonstrated that nanoparticles decorated with poly(2-oxazolines), poly(2-hydroxyethylacrylate) and poly(N-vinylpyrrolidone) exhibit mucus-penetrating properties similar to PEGylated nanocarriers. His other significant research contributions include the new synthesis of thiolated silica nanoparticles, which were subsequently commercialised by PolySciTech; studies of novel ocular penetration enhancers, nanoparticles penetration into various biological membranes,  formulation of encapsulated probiotic bacteria, new method for synthesis of hydrogels, development of new toxicological assays using planaria and the use of various poly(2-oxazolines) for preparation of solid drug dispersions and iodophors.

Books 
He edited and co-edited several books

 Hydrogen-bonded Interpolymer Complexes: Formation, Structure and Applications (edited by V.V. Khutoryanskiy and G.Staikos), World Scientific, 2009

 Mucoadhesive Materials and Drug Delivery Systems (edited by V.V. Khutoryanskiy), John Wiley & Sons, 2014
 Temperature-responsive Polymers: Chemistry, Properties, and Applications (edited by V.V. Khutoryanskiy and T.K. Georgiou), John Wiley & Sons, 2018
 Advances in Mucoadhesive Polymers and Formulations for Transmucosal Drug Delivery (edited by V.V. Khutoryanskiy), MDPI AG, 2020
 Solid Dispersions for Drug Delivery: Applications and Preparation Methods (edited by V.V. Khutoryanskiy and H. Al-Obaidi), MDPI AG, 2022

Awards and honours 

 McBain Medal, a joint award of the Royal Society of Chemistry (RSC) and the Society of Chemical Industry (SCI), for research in the field of colloid, polymer and interface science, 2012
 Honorary Professor of Semey State Medical University, Kazakhstan, 2012
 Honorary Professor of Shakarim State University of Semey, Kazakhstan, 2014
 Fellow of the Royal Society of Chemistry (FRSC), 2015
 Sentinel of Science Award as one of the top 10 % reviewers in chemistry, Publons, 2016
 Honorary Professor of Kazan State Medical University, Russia, 2017
 Polymers Best Paper Award from the journal Polymers (MDPI), 2020
 Certificate of Excellence for the top-5 article published in 2018 in the journal Polymer Science (Russian Academy of Sciences), 2020
 PhD Supervisor of the Year Award (FindAUniversity), 2020
 Innovative Science Award, The Academy of Pharmaceutical Sciences, UK, 2022
 Royal Society Industry Fellow, 2023

Professional services 
Khutoryanskiy serves on editorial boards of several international journals, including European Polymer Journal (Elsevier), Journal of Pharmaceutical Sciences (Elsevier), Pharmaceutics (MDPI), Polymers (MDPI), Gels (MDPI) and Reviews and Advanced in Chemistry (Springer). Also he is associate editor and member of journal editorial boards of several national journals in Kazakhstan,  Uzbekistan and Russia. He guest edited several special issues of Pharmaceutics, Polymers, Gels and Polymers for Advanced Technologies. He is a committee member of Macro Group UK (RSC & SCI Pure and Applied Macromolecular Chemistry Group) and Engineering and Physical Sciences Research Council (EPSRC) peer-review college member. He was involved in organisation of many conferences and symposia as a chair, co-chair and member of organising committees. He is recognised for his outstanding contributions to research peer review and mentoring of early career researchers. Khutoryanskiy has also made substantial contribution to the development of research, training and education of students and researchers at various universities in Kazakhstan.

References 

British chemists
1975 births
Living people

Academics of the University of Reading
Al-Farabi Kazakh National University alumni
Fellows of the Royal Society of Chemistry
Polymer scientists and engineers
Pharmaceutical scientists
British materials scientists
21st-century British chemists